KISK is an FM radio station broadcasting a hot adult contemporary format.  KISK broadcasts on a frequency of 104.9 Megahertz and is located in Cal-Nev-Ari, Nevada.  The broadcasting tower is located on Spirit Mountain.

Translators
FM translators are located in Bullhead City, Arizona, Riviera, Arizona, Kingman, Arizona, Calnevair, Nevada and Peach Springs, Arizona.

Translators

History
The station was issued the call sign KVYL on August 13, 2007; on February 15, 2008, it changed to KVAL. The station signed on in 2008 with a hot adult contemporary format. It became KISK on May 29, 2015.

References

External links

murphybroadcasting.com

ISK
Hot adult contemporary radio stations in the United States
Radio stations established in 2008
2008 establishments in Nevada